Somalia competed at the 2019 World Athletics Championships in Doha, Qatar, from 27 September–6 October 2019.

Result

References 

Nations at the 2019 World Athletics Championships
2019
2019 in Somalian sport